Ensete glaucum, the snow banana, has also been classified as Musa nepalensis, Ensete giganteum, or Ensete wilsonii.

Distribution
This gigantic monocarpic herbaceous plant is native to China, Nepal, India, Myanmar (Burma), and Thailand.

Description
Ensete glaucum has a thick, waxy with sometimes bluish tinge, solitary pseudostem. It grows larger than the Abyssinian Banana (Ensete ventricosum).

Cultivation and uses
The plant is cultivated as an ornamental plant, for its unique swollen bulbous base and large leaves. and is used to feed pigs in parts of China.

In India the pulp of the fruit is eaten, considered highly medicinal, and given to infants and patients. Young shoots and a flowering part are eaten as a vegetable. The plant is used in religious and domestic celebrations.

It is easy to raise from seed.  It is an extremely fast growing banana given heat, but not as hardy as the Abyssinian Banana (Ensete ventricosum), and is not as well known.

References

glaucum
Flora of tropical Asia
Flora of Yunnan
Plants described in 1820
Garden plants of Asia